João José Sales Henriques de Carvalho Pereira (born 28 December 1987) is a Portuguese triathlete who represents Benfica, at club level, and the Portuguese national team.

Career 
On 14 June 2015 he finished 8th at the Men's triathlon competition of the 2015 European Games in Baku, Azerbaijan.

On 18 August 2016 he placed fifth at the Men's triathlon competition of the 2016 Summer Olympics in Rio de Janeiro, Brazil.

On 23 June 2018 he won the Men's triathlon competition of the 2018 Mediterranean Games along with his girlfriend and teammate Melanie Santos who won the women's event.

On 26 July 2021 he placed 27th at Men's triathlon competition of the 2016 Summer Olympics in Tokyo, Japan.

Personal life 
He is in a relationship with Portuguese triathlete Melanie Santos. They both represent Benfica and the Portuguese national team. In 2018, they both won the gold medal in the individual events of the 2018 Mediterranean Games.

Notes and references

External links 
 Portuguese Triathlon Federation 

1987 births
Living people
People from Caldas da Rainha
Portuguese male triathletes
Triathletes at the 2016 Summer Olympics
Triathletes at the 2020 Summer Olympics
Olympic triathletes of Portugal
S.L. Benfica (triathlon)
Competitors at the 2018 Mediterranean Games
Mediterranean Games gold medalists for Portugal
Mediterranean Games medalists in triathlon
European Games competitors for Portugal
Triathletes at the 2015 European Games
Sportspeople from Leiria District
21st-century Portuguese people